Alena Igorevna Leonova (born 23 November 1990) is a retired Russian figure skater. She is the 2012 World silver medalist, the 2011 Grand Prix Final bronze medalist, the 2009 World Junior champion, and a three-time (2010–2012) Russian national medalist. She is also the 2014–15 ISU Challenger Series runner-up.

Personal life 
Alena Igorevna Leonova was born on 23 November 1990 in Saint Petersburg (Leningrad). She has a sister and brother, both of whom skated when they were young.

In April 2019, Leonova married figure skater Anton Shulepov. On 18 February 2022, gave birth to a son Artemy.

Career

Early career 
Leonova started skating at the age of four. Coached initially by Marina Vakhrameeva, she later moved to the group of Tatiana Mishina, who was assisted by Alla Piatova. Piatova formed her own group and became Leonova's main coach when she was 10.

In her junior career, Leonova became a two-time Cup of Nice gold medalist and won silver at the 2007 Junior Grand Prix in Romania. She also won the silver medal at the 2008 Russian Junior Championships. In August 2008, she partially tore ligaments in her right ankle joint. She placed fourth at the 2009 European Championships. She then won gold at the 2009 World Junior Championships., a surprising win as the focus was on Caroline Zhang, Ashley Wagner, and Elene Gedevanishvili as the leading contenders for the title. After her win, the Russian Federation rented an apartment for her.

2009–10 season 
Leonova won the bronze medal at the 2009 Cup of Russia and the silver medal at the 2009 NHK Trophy. These results qualified her for the Grand Prix Final, where she placed sixth. She then won the silver medal at the 2010 Russian Championships and was selected to compete at the 2010 Winter Olympics, where she placed ninth. She concluded her season by placing 13th at the 2010 World Championships.

2010–11 season 
Leonova started her season at the 2010 Coupe de Nice where she won the gold medal. After picking up a pair of bronze medals at the 2010 Finlandia Trophy and 2010 Cup of China, she won another silver medal at the 2011 Russian Championships. Leonova then finished fourth at the 2011 World Championships. Following the event, she began working full-time with Nikolai Morozov in Moscow.

2011–12 season 

Leonova decided to compete in three Grand Prix events in the 2011–12 season. After placing fourth at the 2011 Skate Canada, she won bronze at 2011 NHK Trophy and silver at 2011 Cup of Russia to qualify for her second Grand Prix Final. At the Grand Prix Final, she won the bronze medal.

Leonova won the bronze medal at the 2012 Russian Championships. At the 2012 European Championships, she finished seventh and sustained an injury to her left knee during the free skate. Leonova placed first in the short program at the 2012 World Championships on her way to her first World medal, a silver. Her podium finish was Russia's first in ladies' singles since 2005 when Irina Slutskaya won the title. Leonova was named Russia's team captain at the 2012 World Team Trophy. Competing with a cold, she finished seventh in the ladies' event.

2012–13 season 
Leonova finished seventh at the 2012 Skate America. She placed sixth at her next Grand Prix event, the 2012 Rostelecom Cup. Her coach attributed Leonova's poor performances at the events to worn out equipment. Leonova finished seventh at the 2013 Russian Championships where she competed with a new long program that was put together one week before the competition. She was not assigned to the 2013 European Championships because Nikol Gosviani placed ahead of Leonova amongst the age-eligible ladies. Leonova was sent to the 2013 World Championships. She returned to her long program from the previous season and finished thirteenth at the event.

2013–14 season 
Leonova withdrew from her first 2013–14 Grand Prix event, the 2013 Skate Canada, due to a sprained ankle. Leonova competed in her second event, at the 2013 NHK Trophy and finished seventh. At the 2014 Russian Championships, Leonova placed fourth in the short and seventh in the free, finishing fifth overall. She was assigned to the 2014 European Championships because the skaters in third and fourth place (Elena Radionova and Alexandra Proklova respectively) were not yet age-eligible for senior ISU Championship events. Leonova missed the podium at Europeans, finishing fourth overall. She was coached by Morozov in Novogorsk, Moscow until the end of the season.

2014–15 season 
In June 2014, Leonova began training under Evgeni Rukavicin in Saint Petersburg. She started the 2014–15 season with a silver medal at the 2014 Nebelhorn Trophy. Her 2014–15 Grand Prix assignments were the 2014 Skate Canada International and 2014 NHK Trophy. She then finished ninth at the 2016 Russian Championships. She ended her season with a win at the Russian Cup Final.

2017–18 season 
Alena finished fifth in both the 2017 CS Finlandia Trophy and the 2017 CS Ondrej Nepela Trophy, resulting in her finishing seventh in the 2017–18 ISU Challenger Series. Alena Finished sixth in the 2017 NHK Trophy, earning personal best scores in the free skate and overall score. At the 2017 Skate America she finished in seventh place. Alena was not selected for a place on the Russian National Team.

2018–19 season 
Alena was invited to the 2018 NHK Trophy after Elena Radionova withdrew due to injury. She finished seventh in the most competitive event of the Grand Prix season, achieving new personal bests in the short program and total score. At the 2019 Russian Championships, she placed twelfth.

Skating style 

Leonova is renowned for either superb technical ability, great style or artistic abilities, or noteworthy consistency, but she increasingly has gained recognition and praise for her unique choreography, on ice personality and delivery of her programs, and speed and attack. Her programs in the 2011 and 2012 seasons, done by renowned choreographer Nikolai Morozov, were noted for their creativity, rather bizarre and off beat quality, and complexity, and her delivery and commitment to them were praised. Early in her career she drew comparisons to former Russian great Irina Slutskaya due to her strong jumping ability and effervescent personality on the ice.

Programs

Competitive highlights 

GP: Grand Prix; CS: Challenger Series; JGP: Junior Grand Prix

Detailed results

Small medals for short and free programs awarded only at ISU Championships.

References

External links 

 
 

1990 births
Russian female single skaters
Figure skaters at the 2010 Winter Olympics
Living people
Olympic figure skaters of Russia
Figure skaters from Saint Petersburg
World Figure Skating Championships medalists
World Junior Figure Skating Championships medalists
Universiade medalists in figure skating
Universiade gold medalists for Russia
Competitors at the 2015 Winter Universiade
Competitors at the 2017 Winter Universiade
Figure skating choreographers
21st-century Russian women